Demon Blood (German: Dämon Blut) is a 1920 German silent film directed by Fred Sauer.

Cast
In alphabetical order
 Emil Biron
 Ernst Dernburg
 Käthe Haack
 Aenderly Lebius
 Nien Soen Ling
 Frederic Nay
 Heinrich Peer
 Max Ruhbeck
 Fred Sauer
 Heinrich Schroth
 Emmy Sturm

References

Bibliography
 Rolf Giesen. The Nosferatu Story: The Seminal Horror Film, Its Predecessors and Its Enduring Legacy. McFarland, 2019.

External links

1920 films
Films of the Weimar Republic
Films directed by Fred Sauer
German silent feature films